Androscoggin County (French: Comté d'Androscoggin) is a county in the U.S. state of Maine. As of the 2020 census, the county's population was 111,139. Its county seat is Auburn and its largest city is Lewiston.

Androscoggin County comprises the Lewiston-Auburn, Maine Metropolitan Statistical Area and is partially included in the Lewiston-Auburn, Maine, Metropolitan New England City and Town Area. It is also a part of the Portland-Lewiston-South Portland, Maine Combined Statistical Area.

Bates College is in the Androscoggin County city of Lewiston.

History
Demand for a new county emerged when the residents of the rapidly growing town of Lewiston complained of the long distance they had to travel to reach Wiscasset, the county seat of Lincoln County, in which Lewiston was originally located. It was also an impractical circumstance as Lewiston's neighbor, Auburn, was part of Cumberland County. As the growing partnership of the two towns emerged, the case for the towns to be in the same county grew. Different plans were discussed, including Lewiston joining Cumberland County. Eventually, the idea of a new county came to the table. The debate then became over which town would be the center of the new county. Bath, Brunswick, and Lewiston each desired the distinction. Lewiston eventually won the debate. Androscoggin County was created in 1854 from towns originally in Cumberland County, Lincoln County, Kennebec County, and Oxford County.

The next issue centered on where to put the county seat, as both Lewiston and Auburn desired to be named the county seat. It would eventually be put to a vote, with both towns putting different offers on the table, including ideas to cut the costs of the new county buildings for surrounding towns. Auburn would eventually win a convincing victory, with the towns on each side of the river voting for the town on their side. As more people then lived to the west of the Androscoggin River, Auburn won the vote.

Geography
It is the second-smallest county in Maine by total area.

Adjacent counties
Franklin County – north
Kennebec County – northeast
Sagadahoc County – southeast
Cumberland County – south
Oxford County – west

Demographics

2000 census
As of the census of 2000, there were 103,793 people, 42,028 households, and 27,192 families living in the county.  The population density was 221 people per square mile (85/km2).  There were 45,960 housing units at an average density of 98 per square mile (38/km2).  The racial makeup of the county was 96.98% White, 0.66% Black or African American, 0.27% Native American, 0.55% Asian, 0.04% Pacific Islander, 0.28% from other races, and 1.22% from two or more races.  0.95% of the population were Hispanic or Latino of any race. 24.5% were of French Canadian, 19.4% French, 14.3% English, 9.7% United States or American and 8.4% Irish ancestry. 9.6% of the population speak French and 1.5% of the population speak Spanish at home.

Of the 42,028 households 30.90% had children under the age of 18 living with them, 49.60% were married couples living together, 10.80% had a female householder with no husband present, and 35.30% were non-families. 28.30% of households were one person and 11.00% were one person aged 65 or older.  The average household size was 2.38 and the average family size was 2.91.

The age distribution was 23.90% under the age of 18, 9.10% from 18 to 24, 29.70% from 25 to 44, 22.90% from 45 to 64, and 14.40% 65 or older.  The median age was 37 years. For every 100 females there were 94.30 males.  For every 100 females age 18 and over, there were 91.20 males.

The median household income was $35,793 and the median family income  was $44,082. Males had a median income of $31,622 versus $22,366 for females. The per capita income for the county was $18,734.  About 7.50% of families and 11.10% of the population were below the poverty line, including 13.80% of those under age 18 and 11.00% of those age 65 or over.

2010 census
At the 2010 census, there were 107,702 people, 44,315 households, and 28,045 families living in the county. The racial makeup of the county was 92.8% white, 3.6% black or African American, 0.7% Asian, 0.4% American Indian, 0.4% from other races, and 2.0% from two or more races. Those of Hispanic or Latino origin made up 1.5% of the population. The largest ancestry groups were as follows: 21.2% cited English ancestry, 20.5% French Canadian, 20.1% French (not counted in the previous group), 15.5% Irish, 8.1% German, and 5.0% American.

Of the 44,315 households, 30.2% had children under the age of 18 living with them, 45.8% were married couples living together, 12.0% had a female householder with no husband present, 36.7% were non-families, and 28.3% of households were made up of individuals. The average household size was 2.37 and the average family size was 2.88. The median age was 39.8 years.

The median household income was $44,470 and the median family income  was $55,045. Males had a median income of $41,554 versus $31,852 for females. The per capita income for the county was $22,752. About 9.7% of families and 14.3% of the population were below the poverty line, including 20.0% of those under age 18 and 12.4% of those age 65 or over.

Media

Newspapers
 The Sun Journal prints a daily newspaper in four different editions statewide. The Sun Journal was the recipient of the 2008 New England Daily Newspaper of the Year and the 2009 Maine Press Association Newspaper of the Year.

Politics

Presidential elections
In Presidential elections, Androscoggin County is considered a "swing area" by most political standards,  with a fairly even split between Democratic and Republican voters. It was the only county in Maine to be won by Democrats Franklin D. Roosevelt in 1932 and George McGovern in 1972. Jimmy Carter also carried the county twice. In 1984 and 1988, it went for Republican candidates Ronald Reagan and George H.W. Bush, who also won the state of Maine. However, the county narrowly swayed in favor of Republican Donald Trump for both the 2016 and 2020 elections; even as the state as a whole was won by Democrats Hillary Clinton and Joe Biden, respectively.

|}

State politics

In 2012, the county voted 54% against Maine Question 1, 2012 – a measure to legalize same-sex marriage, but the referendum passed in the state by 53%.

County government
Androscoggin County is governed by an elected county commission consisting of seven members representing single-member districts. Currently, the county commissioners are:

Voter registration

Incorporated towns and cities
Auburn
Durham
Greene
Leeds
Lewiston
Lisbon
Livermore
Livermore Falls
Mechanic Falls
Minot
Poland
Sabattus
Turner
Wales

Census-designated places
Greene
Lisbon
Lisbon Falls
Livermore Falls
Mechanic Falls
Sabattus
Turner

Economy
Some agriculture exists here. Androscoggin is especially known for poultry  ranking #1 in the state for the poultry and egg category from 77 producing farms. The county is also top in the state for hog and pig production.

See also
Androscoggin Creature
Lisbon School Department
National Register of Historic Places listings in Androscoggin County, Maine

References

External links
Androscoggin County Chamber of Commerce
Maine Local Government – County of Androscoggin page

 

 
Maine counties
Maine placenames of Native American origin
1854 establishments in Maine
Populated places established in 1854